Stubble burning is the practice of intentionally setting fire to the straw stubble that remains after grains, such as rice and wheat, have been harvested. The technique is still widespread today.

Effects

The burning of stubble has both positive and negative consequences.

Generally helpful effects
 Cheaper and easier than other removal methods
 Helps to combat pests and weeds
 Can reduce nitrogen tie-up

Generally harmful effects
 Loss of nutrients
 Pollution from smoke. Including greenhouse gases and others that damage the ozone layer
 Damage to electrical and electronic equipment from floating threads of conductive waste
 Risk of fires spreading out of control

Alternative to stubble burning
Agriculture residues can have other uses, such as in particle board and biofuel, though these uses can still cause problems like erosion and nutrient loss.

Spraying an enzyme, which decomposes the stubble into useful fertiliser, improves the soil, avoids air pollution and prevents carbon dioxide emissions.

Attitudes toward stubble burning
Stubble burning has been effectively prohibited since 1993 in the United Kingdom. A perceived increase in blackgrass, and particularly herbicide resistant blackgrass, has led to a campaign by some arable farmers for its return.
In Australia stubble burning is "not the preferred option for the majority of farmers" but is permitted and recommended in some circumstances. Farmers are advised to rake and burn windrows, and leave a fire break of 3 metres around any burn off.
In the United States, fires are fairly common in mid-western states, but some states such as Oregon and Idaho regulate the practice.
In the European Union, the Common Agricultural Policy strongly discourages stubble burning.
In China, there is a government ban on stubble burning; however the practice remains fairly common.
In northern India, despite a ban by the Punjab Pollution Control Board, stubble burning is still practiced since the 1980s. Authorities are starting to enforce this ban more proactively, and to research alternatives.
 Stubble burning is allowed by permit in some Canadian provinces, including Manitoba where 5% of farmers were estimated to do it in 2007.

India

Stubble burning in Punjab, Haryana, and Uttar Pradesh in north India has been cited as a major cause of air pollution in Delhi since 1980. Consequently, the government is considering implementation of the 1,600 km long and 5 km wide Great Green Wall of Aravalli. From April to May and October to November each year, farmers mainly in Punjab, Haryana, and Uttar Pradesh burn an estimated 35 million tons of crop waste from their wheat and paddy fields after harvesting as a low-cost straw-disposal practice to reduce the turnaround time between harvesting and sowing for the first (summer) crop and the second (winter) crop. Smoke from this burning produces a cloud of particulates visible from space and has produced what has been described as a "toxic cloud" in New Delhi, resulting in declarations of an air-pollution emergency. For this, the NGT (National Green Tribunal) instituted a fine of ₹2 lakh on the Delhi Government for failing to file an action plan providing incentives and infrastructural assistance to farmers to stop them from burning crop residue to prevent air pollution.

Although harvesters such as the Indian-manufactured "Happy Seeder" that shred the crop residues into small pieces and uniformly spread them across the field are available as an alternative to burning stubble, and crops such as millets and maize can be grown as an sustainable alternative to rice and wheat in order to conserve water, some farmers complain that the cost of these machines is a significant financial burden, with the crops not incurred under MSP prices when compared to burning the fields and purchasing crops that are produced under MSP prices.

The Indian Agricultural Research Institute, developed an enzyme bio-decomposer solution, that can be sprayed after the harvest, to increase organic carbon in the soil and maintain overall soil health. In 2021, they began licensing its use to various companies.
In May 2022, the Government of Punjab announced they will purchase maize, bajra, sunflower and moong crops at MSP, encouraging farmers to adopt less water consuming options as a sustainable alternative to paddy and wheat in the wake of fast-depleting groundwater. Stubble burning has increased 160% now in Rajasthan in India claims a minister.

See also
Slash-and-burn

References

Agriculture
Articles containing video clips
Fire
Horticultural techniques